Robert Cameron (23 November 1932 – 21 February 2022) was a professional footballer who played for Queens Park Rangers, Leeds United and Southend United.

Playing career
Cameron was a Scottish schoolboy international and joined Queens Park Rangers, where he scored 59 goals in 256 league appearances between 1950–51 and 1958–59. He was signed from Port Glasgow Rovers. He joined Leeds United in 1959 at a time when Leeds were struggling and were then relegated from the First Division at the end of the 1959–60 season. Cameron scored nine goals in 58 league appearances for Leeds, but his playing time became scarcer during the 1961–62 season and he joined non-league club Gravesend and Northfleet at the end of the season. He returned to the Football League with Southend United in October 1963.

Cameron was an attacking player with a cheerful disposition but casual attitude who would seek the ball so to get it forward.

References

Queens Park Rangers F.C. players
Leeds United F.C. players
1932 births
Living people
Southend United F.C. players
Ebbsfleet United F.C. players
English Football League players
London XI players
Scottish footballers
Association football inside forwards